The Malaysia Junior Hockey League (MJHL) is a top junior league competition for junior field hockey clubs in the Malaysian hockey system. At present also it is sponsored by Milo and National Sports Council.

Teams
A record 27 teams will feature in the 2014 Malaysian Junior Hockey League.

Former teams

  Sapura
  Polimas
  Penang Free School Junior
  Kedah HA-MSN Kedah
  SMK Tinggi Setapak
  SMK Datuk Syed Ahmad
  MSN-MSS Sabah
  MSS-Sarawak
  SMK St. Davids
  St. John's Institution
  MBPJ
  KLHC
  Tunas Muda Pahang
  1MAS Penang

History

Origin
The tournament was initiated to revive interest in the sport which was losing spectator interest to football in recent times. Hockey is one of Malaysia's major sports.

One of the main reasons for the waning popularity of the existing domestic competition was the rise of corporate teams such as Ernst & Young, TNB and Maybank which do not have a steady fan following. MHL is trying to change that by bringing in regional flavour. It fields teams from traditional hockey bastions such as Kuala Lumpur, Penang, other areas, as well as from other places where it has got some fan following.

The MHC-Milo-NSC Malaysia Junior Hockey League (MJHL) made its debut in 1995.

Founding

The competition was first played in 2000 involving 11 teams. Initiated by Malaysian Hockey Federation (MHF) with active support from sports channel ESPN Malaysia. First season had two tiers division 1 and division 2 but from 2007 season onwards division 2 was scrapped. Except team winning 2006 division 2 championship rest all teams in division 2 were scrapped.

Competition

Malaysian Women's Junior Hockey League
The inaugural women’s junior league, also an Under-19 event took off in 2016 season. It runs from February 19 to April 10. The league attracted the participation of 14 teams from nine states, with exception of teams from Perlis, Malacca and Sarawak.

SSTMI-Thunderbolt lifted the inaugural Women’s Junior Hockey League title with a slim 2-1 win over Kuala Lumpur Wipers in the final.

Girls' team
The league is specifically for boys’ Under-19 league, however few women's team has expressed interest to join the junior league. This includes Tunku Mahkota Ismail Sports School (SSTMI) girls’ team that have submitted their entry to play in the 2013 season.

In the 2011 season, the national women’s team featured in the MJHL as invitation team because there was lack of women’s domestic competitions. It was known as MWHA-SSBP in the MJHL that year. Matri, a team from Perlis refused to play against the MWHA-SSBP team on religious grounds and that resulted in Matri being thrown out of the league, fined RM500 and banned for a year.

New features

Players

A team shall consist of maximum of 18 (eighteen) players to be registered with MHF.
Out of the above 18, maximum of 3 players can be of foreign origin. At any given point of time minimum 2 players of foreign origin shall be within the field of play during the course of a game. All 18 players in a team have to be registered with the MHF and need to submit their identity cards before the start of the league qualifying for playing in a team. All Malaysian players currently employed have to be taken on lien for the duration of the league and then be registered with MHF. All the foreign players must obtain International Transfer Certificates from their respective countries and or clubs before signing up with the team in MHL and MHF.

Import players

There are a number of players from countries other than Malaysia, who have been contracted to play in the league.

Champions

League
The league champion is crowned by finishing top of the league table of two round robin matches.

Cup
The overall cup is also known as MILO-MJHL Cup due to sponsorship reason.

See also

 Malaysian Hockey Federation
 Malaysia men's national field hockey team
 Malaysia women's national field hockey team
 Malaysia Hockey League

References

 The Star Online January 14, 2014
 The Star May 5, 2007
 The Star June 26, 2009

External links 
 

Junior